Szczecin University of Technology was one of the biggest universities in Szczecin, Poland.

History
Szczecin University of Technology was established on 1 December 1946 as School of Engineering in Szczecin (Polish: Szkoła Inżynierska w Szczecinie). Initially it included three faculties - Faculty of Electrical Engineering (Polish: Wydział Elektryczny), Faculty of Civil Engineering (Polish: Wydział Inżynierii Lądowej) and Faculty of Mechanical Engineering (Polish: Wydział Mechaniczny). In the following academic year, it was expanded with opening of Faculty of Chemical Engineering (Polish: Wydział Chemiczny).

On 1 September 1955 it took over  departments of liquidated School of Economics in Szczecin (Polish: Szkoła Ekonomiczna w Szczecinie) and established Faculty of Engineering and Economics of Transport (Polish: Wydział Inżynieryjno-Ekonomiczny Transportu). On 3 September 1955 it was transformed into Technical University of Szczecin.

In 1985 University of Szczecin took over Faculty of Engineering and Economics of Transport.

The university has been existing to 1 January 2009, when in result of fusion with University of Agriculture in Szczecin, was created West Pomeranian University of Technology.

Organization of former University

Faculties
 Faculty of Chemical Engineering (Polish: Wydział Technologii i Inżynierii Chemicznej)
 Faculty of Civil Engineering and Architecture (Polish: Wydział Budownictwa i Architektury)
 Faculty of Computer Science and Information Technology (Polish: Wydział Informatyki)
 Faculty of Electrical Engineering (Polish: Wydział Elektryczny)
 Faculty of Maritime Technology (Polish: Wydział Techniki Morskiej)
 Faculty of Mechanical Engineering (Polish: Wydział Mechaniczny)

See also
West Pomeranian University of Technology

External links
Official homepage

1946 establishments in Poland
2009 disestablishments in Poland
Technical
Szczecin
Szczecin

de:Technische Universität Stettin